Routier is a commune in the Aude department in southern France.

Population

Notable people 
 Lazare Escarguel (1816-1893), politician and newspaper editor born and died in Routier.

See also
Communes of the Aude department

References

Communes of Aude
Aude communes articles needing translation from French Wikipedia